The Nebraska Cornhuskers women's soccer team represents the  University of Nebraska–Lincoln in the Big Ten Conference of NCAA Division I. The program has been coached by John Walker since being established in 1994. Walker was the NSCAA National Coach of the Year in 1996 and has been named conference coach of the year three times.

In twenty-nine years of competition, the program has won 348 matches and competed in twelve NCAA Division I Women's Soccer Championships.

Coaches

Coaching history

Coaching staff

History
In 1994, Nebraska became the first Big Eight school to add women's soccer as a varsity sport. John Walker, now in his thirtieth season as head coach, led the program to its first NCAA Championship appearance in 1996. The Cornhuskers began the 1996 season 21–0–0, winning the Big 12 for the first time and advancing to the NCAA Division I quarterfinals. NU has since won five more conference tournaments, in 1998–2000, 2002, and 2013. In fifteen years of Big 12 competition, the Cornhuskers compiled a league-best record of 106–47–15. Nebraska has produced forty-seven first-team and seventy total all-conference selections, as well as thirty-three all-conference tournament awards.

The Cornhuskers play home games at Barbara Hibner Soccer Stadium, named after former Women's Athletic Director Barbara Hibner, who was integral to the introduction of soccer as a varsity sport at NU. Hibner Stadium was built in 2015 and has a maximum capacity of 2,500. Walker said of the new stadium: "This is phenomenal. Everything is first class. There's nothing cookie-cutter about it." Nebraska has ranked first or second in the Big Ten in attendance in each season at the venue. For two decades before moving to Hibner Stadium, NU played at the Ed Weir Track and Field Stadium, located just northeast of Memorial Stadium. The Weir complex, built in 1975, was one of the smallest soccer venues in the Big Ten.

All-Americans
Thirteen Cornhuskers have earned nineteen total All-America selections.

Season-by-season results

Notes

References

NCAA Division I women's soccer teams
Women's Soccer
Big Ten Conference women's soccer